Robert (Bob) Bernecky is a Canadian computer scientist notable as a designer and implementer of APL.  His APL career started at I.P. Sharp Associates (IPSA) in 1971.

Bernecky's first published APL work concerned with speeding up the iota and epsilon (index-of and membership) primitives functions by orders of magnitude. While at IPSA, he was a colleague of Roger Hui, Dick Lathwell, Eugene McDonnell, Roger Moore, Arthur Whitney, and APL inventor Ken Iverson.

He continued on after IPSA was acquired by Reuters on 1987-04-01, and left Reuters in 1990 to found Snake Island Research.  He conducts research into functional array languages, APL compiler, and parallel-processing technology to this day.

Bernecky holds the Master of Science degree from the University of Toronto.

References

External links
 Snake Island Research Inc.

Living people
APL implementers
California Institute of Technology alumni
Canadian computer scientists
I. P. Sharp Associates employees
Programming language designers
University of Toronto alumni
1947 births